Delta11-fatty-acid desaturase (Delta11 desaturase, fatty acid Delta11-desaturase, TpDESN, Cro-PG, Delta11 fatty acid desaturase, Z/E11-desaturase, Delta11-palmitoyl-CoA desaturase) is an enzyme with systematic name acyl-CoA,hydrogen donor:oxygen Delta11-oxidoreductase. This enzyme catalyses the following chemical reaction

 acyl-CoA + reduced acceptor + O2  Delta11-acyl-CoA + acceptor + 2 H2O

The enzyme from the marine microalga Thalassiosira pseudonana desaturates palmitic acid 16:0 to 16:1Delta11, whereas that from the leafroller moth Choristoneura rosaceana desaturates myristic acid 14:0 to 14:1Delta11.

References

External links 
 

EC 1.14.19